There are over 9,300 Grade I listed buildings in England.  This page is a list of the 111 of these buildings in the ceremonial county of the East Riding of Yorkshire.
In the United Kingdom, the term listed building refers to a building or other structure officially designated as being of special architectural, historical or cultural significance; Grade I structures are those considered to be "buildings of exceptional interest". In England, the authority for listing under the Planning (Listed Buildings and Conservation Areas) Act 1990 rests with Historic England, a non-departmental public body sponsored by the Department for Culture, Media and Sport.

City of Kingston upon Hull

|}

East Riding of Yorkshire

|}

See also
 :Category:Grade I listed buildings in the East Riding of Yorkshire
 Grade I listed churches in the East Riding of Yorkshire

Notes

References 

Historic England Images of England

 
East Riding of Yorkshire
East Riding of Yorkshire